Aleksey Vasiliyevich Drozdov (born 3 December 1983) is a Russian decathlete born in Klintsy, Bryansk Oblast.

International competitions

Professional decathlons

References

 

1983 births
Living people
People from Klintsy
Sportspeople from Bryansk Oblast
Russian decathletes
Olympic athletes of Russia
Athletes (track and field) at the 2008 Summer Olympics
World Athletics Championships athletes for Russia
European Athletics Championships medalists